Herkimer County Trust Company Building is a historic bank building located at Little Falls, New York in Herkimer County, New York.  It was built in 1833 and is a three-by-two-bay rectangular structure built of cut stone and broken range masonry.  It features a portico supported by four Ionic order stone columns and gable roof in the Greek Revival style.  It housed the Herkimer County Bank/Herkimer County Trust Company until 1917, and now houses the local historical society.

It was listed on the National Register of Historic Places in 1970.

References

Bank buildings on the National Register of Historic Places in New York (state)
Greek Revival architecture in New York (state)
Commercial buildings completed in 1833
Buildings and structures in Herkimer County, New York
National Register of Historic Places in Herkimer County, New York